Olenecamptus siamensis is a species of beetle in the family Cerambycidae. It was described by Stephan von Breuning in 1936. It is known from China, Sumatra, Myanmar, Vietnam, Thailand, and Taiwan. It contains the varietas Olenecamptus siamensis var. reductus.

References

Dorcaschematini
Beetles described in 1936